Import gamers are a subset of the video game player community that take part in the practice of playing video games from another region, usually from Japan where the majority of games for certain systems originate.

Reasons for importing 
There is no uniform motivation among import gamers, but some common reasons for importing include:

Wider selection of titles. Not all video games are available in all countries, and a large fraction of games are not released outside Japan. This is especially true of the visual novel medium, or many games based on licensed anime/live TV series where very few titles have ever been given overseas releases. Those who are interested in these games but do not live in Japan can only enjoy them through importing. This also applies to Anglophone European gamers who purchase North American game releases, as it offers an extended selection of English titles. Japan is not the only region to have exclusive games which attract importers, simply the most common.
Localization issues. Many import gamers do not want games that feature edited dialogue, changed names, re-dubbed audio tracks, removal/censorship of content, and/or other similar changes which often appear in translated versions.
Collector's value. Sometimes, an enthusiastic fan of a series that is released in their local region will buy both the domestic and the Japanese copies. This is also sometimes done for special print or premium box versions which are more common in Japanese releases than those from other regions and come with special extras.
Language factor. Import gaming is common among students looking to improve their language skills, and for native speakers of Japanese who do not live in Japan. This is also occasionally done with games in other languages, though less commonly. Some non-students who import games would learn foreign languages (English and Japanese) just to be able to play these games. Additionally, the region provisioning in some regions does not make sense- for example, NTSC/J was assigned as the region for South-East Asia and many games were released in Japanese, despite the fact that few people in the region understood Japanese.
Advance release. Some do not wish to wait for a game to be released in their local region, and import the Japanese (non-domestic) copies to obtain the game sooner. This is very common in English-speaking countries (i.e. UK and Australia) where games are often released later than in the USA. This is also sometimes done with consoles; shops offering advance PSP imports recently made news when Sony took action against them.
Financial reasons. Due to high release-prices, it is often considerably cheaper for gamers to buy Japanese (non-domestic) versions of popular games that have already passed out of the "new release" phase of their marketing in the foreign country. Furthermore, because of variations in international exchange rates and international video game market demand, import gamers may save money by importing games instead of buying localized versions, even when shipping and handling costs and import tax are taken into consideration. This is also true within the used games market offering used import games way cheaper than local new games due to the localization delay. Before, however, the introduction of the Euro, new import games were commonly sold 40% more expensive by import shops than the European local edition. Similar price disparities exist between American and Asian markets. Additionally, certain retro games no longer being manufactured are much rarer and thus more expensive in domestic markets, while Japanese copies are more abundant and therefore cheaper.
Technical issues. US and Japanese games were historically developed with NTSC television specs (480 lines, 60 Hz) in mind. PAL specs (576 lines, 50 Hz) used in the EU required changes to the source code of these games. While some games were rewritten accordingly, some weren't (or were done so only partially). Issues include black bars on top and bottom of the picture to make up for the 96 missing lines, resulting in a distorted image. Due to the different refresh ratio, some PAL games are about 17% slower than their NTSC counterpart. An infamous example would be the entire SquareEnix lineup on Sony systems, as well as other RPGs of different make. Users could often override these effects by applying their own software or hardware modifications to their setup (thus forcing the PAL software back into its native 480i/60 Hz resolution), but this may be out of the scope of some users, could potentially invalidate the system warranty (as opening up older cartridge-based machines was necessary to force 60 Hz), and in some instances could disrupt "PAL optimisations" that the coder applied (such as PAL-optimised video or 576i menu screens – even where the game itself was not PAL-optimized). Another factor to consider is that certain features are inherently included with software in some territories (such as the 480p option on NTSC Nintendo GameCube consoles and 1080i/720p exclusive to NTSC version of Microsoft Xbox), but not on others. As HDTV hardware spread however, games for the Xbox 360 and PlayStation 3 were typically programmed in 720p or 1080p (which are standard across all territories), thus eliminating the TV specs hurdle. Also - starting with the Dreamcast - most software in PAL territories included the option to play PAL software in its original 480i/60 Hz format.

Region-free consoles 
While many games consoles do not allow games from other countries to be played on them (mainly due to voltage, localization and licensing issues), some consoles (often handheld, due to the universal nature of batteries) are not necessarily restricted to a certain locale. Some of these include:
3DO Interactive Multiplayer
Atari Jaguar
Atari Jaguar CD
Game Boy/GB Pocket/GB Light
Game Boy Color
Game Boy Advance/GBA SP/GB Micro
Game Gear
Neo Geo
Neo Geo CD/CDZ
Neo Geo Pocket Color
Nintendo Entertainment System (NES-101 model only, concerns only NTSC NES and PAL NES. Famicom games need a special cartridge converter, and some features like extra sound channels will be missing.)
Nintendo DS/DS Lite
Nintendo Switch
TurboGrafx-CD/PC Engine CD-ROM2 System
Master System
PlayStation Portable
PlayStation Vita
PlayStation 3
PlayStation 4. Although Sony has said that it is possible to region lock titles, they strongly discourage developers from doing so. 
PlayStation 5. Similar to the PlayStation 4, Sony has said region locking is a possibility, but discouraged. 
Super Game Boy (the SGB itself is locked for either PAL or NTSC SNES)
Super Game Boy 2 (doesn't work with PAL SNES) 
Super NES (concerns only Japanese Super Famicom and NTSC SNES, cut out two tabs in cartridge slot)
Nintendo 64 (concerns only Japanese N64 and NTSC N64, remove two tabs in the back of the cartridge tray)
Vectrex Vectrex games, Controllers, 3D Imagers, and other accessories are not region specific. The box and manual language printing are the only differences.
Virtual Boy
Xbox One – Initially to be strictly region-locked by means of IP Geolocation through a mandatory network connection so that the console will not be usable outside its intended region, however Microsoft has retracted the function and the console is now technically region-free.
Xbox Series X and Series S

Note: Pre-third generation consoles are not listed because at the time there was little to no importing and consequently there was little reason to introduce regional lock-out. Sometime importing difficulties may still arise (e.g. Atari 2600 games from regions the console is not from may introduce some glitches, such as missing colors).

Most handheld video game systems are region free due to most of them having a built in screen, run on batteries and being much cheaper to produce if they do not have a region lock on the system or games.

Disk-based protected systems 
The majority of disk-based home consoles released in more than one region feature regional lockout, the main exceptions being the 3DO Interactive Multiplayer and the Sony PlayStation 3.

Modchips are a popular choice for many of these consoles as they are generally the easiest to use; however a poorly installed chip could permanently break the console. Some modern consoles, such as Xbox, cannot be used for online play if chipped. However, some Xbox modchips can be turned off by the user, allowing online play.

Boot disks are another common choice, as they are generally reliable and do not require risky installation methods. These disks are loaded as though they are local game disks, then prompt the user to swap them for an imported game, allowing it to run. A Wii "Freeloader" boot disk was launched by Codejunkies. However, the Freeloader boot disk was rendered unusable with the release of Firmware 3.3 for the Wii. Most Wii users have since turned to "hacking" their Wii instead using the "Twilight Hack", and when Nintendo patched the bug that allowed the exploit to take place in Firmware 4.0, users soon discovered another method, aptly called the "BannerBomb Hack". This, when combined with the Homebrew channel and a disk loader application, allows users to bypass region checks for Wii games. Aside from the Freeloader series, other boot disks include the Action Replay, the Utopia boot disk, Bleemcast!, and numerous other softmod disks.

The Sega Saturn has a fairly unusual workaround; while a disk-based console, it has a cartridge slot generally used for backup memory, cheat cards, and other utilities. This same slot can also be used for cartridges that allow imported games to run. Some of these cartridges include regional bypass, extra memory, RAM expansion(s), and cheat devices all in one, while others feature only regional bypass and cannot play certain Japanese Saturn games that require RAM expansion cartridges.

The Xbox is not very restrictive due to the console being capable of "softmods" which can do things such as make the console region-free, allowing for burned games to be used and homebrew and multimedia functionality

All three major game console makers refuse to repair any system that has been modded or if boot disks are used.

Single-region consoles 
Some consoles are only released in one region, and therefore have no protection. These include:

NEC PC-FX
Bandai WonderSwan
Bandai WonderSwan Color/SwanCrystal
Fujitsu FM Towns
Fujitsu FM Towns Marty
Casio Loopy
Daewoo Zemmix
Sega SG-1000 Mark I
SG-1000
Sega SC-3000
Neo Geo Pocket

PC-based import gaming 
The PC is a popular platform for import gaming as well. While some operating systems are unable to run games designed for other language versions of the same operating system,  others, such as Windows XP and Windows Vista, are capable of being set to run Japanese (and/or other non-local) games and other software. Another method of importing is using a region-free disk drive.

See also 
PAL
NTSC-C
NTSC-J
NTSC-U/C

Notes

References 

Video game culture